Graphosia bilineata is a moth of the family Erebidae. It was described by George Hampson in 1900. It is found on New Guinea.

References

 

Lithosiina
Moths described in 1900